The 2011 South Korean Figure Skating Championships were the South Korean Figure Skating Championships for the 2010-11 season. They were the 65th edition of those championships held. They were organized by the Korean Skating Union.

Skaters competed in the disciplines of men's and ladies' singles on the senior, junior, and novice levels for the title of national champion of South Korea. The results of the national championships were used to choose the Korean teams to the 2011 World Figure Skating Championships and the 2011 Four Continents Figure Skating Championships. The teams to the 2011 World Junior Figure Skating Championships had previously been chosen at a ranking competition.

The competition was held between 14 and 16 January 2011 at the Taereung Ice Rink in Seoul.

Competition notes
 Kim Yuna did not compete.
 Senior ladies champion Kim Hae-jin and silver medalist Park So-youn were age-ineligible for the World Championships. Kwak Min-jeong was therefore sent to the World Championships in her place.

Senior results

Men

Ladies

Junior results

Men

Ladies

Novice results

Boys

Girls

International team selections

World Championships

Four Continents Championships

World Junior Championships

Asian Winter Games

External links
  

South Korean Figure Skating Championships
2011 in figure skating
Figure skating
January 2011 sports events in South Korea